Martinus Bosselaar (January 16, 1936 – June 6, 2018) was a Dutch footballer who played as a left winger.

Club career

He became the head subject in the "Bosselaar-affair" in 1956. Bosselaar and Sparta both agreed on a return to the club as his heart was still at the other side of the city and his contract had a clause saying that he could leave the club to rejoin Sparta at any time. Feyenoord however did not want to let him go and took Sparta to court. Eventually Feyenoord lost the case and Bosselaar left the club and returned to his love in football.

International career
Bosselaar played his first international match on October 16, 1955 in a 2-2 draw versus Belgium. In his second cap against Norway he netted two of his in total four international goals in a 3-0 win.

Personal life
He suffered from a heart attack in 2004. He died on June 6, 2018 at the age of 82 years old.

Honours
Sparta Rotterdam
 Eredivisie: 1958–59
 KNVB Cup: 1957–58, 1961–62, 1965–66

References

External links
 
 
 
 Profile

1936 births
2018 deaths
Footballers from Rotterdam
Association football wingers
Dutch footballers
Netherlands international footballers
Sparta Rotterdam players
Feyenoord players
Eredivisie players